Agility Public Warehousing Company K.S.C.P. is a publicly traded global company headquartered in Kuwait, and is a leading provider of supply chain services, innovation and investment. Agility owns and operates businesses that include the world’s largest aviation services company; the market leader in industrial warehousing and logistics parks in the Middle East, South Asia, and Africa; a commercial real estate business developing a $1.2 billion mega-mall in the UAE; a liquid fuel logistics business; and companies specializing in customs digitization, remote infrastructure services, e-commerce enablement, digital logistics, and more. The company invests in technologies and ventures that enhance supply chain efficiency and sustainability, and expand access to global trade for entrepreneurs, startups and small and medium-sized businesses.

Agility shares have traded on the Kuwait Stock Exchange (KSE: AGLTY) since 1984 and the Dubai Financial Market (DFM: AGLTY) since 2006.

Corporate Structure 

Agility’s businesses include:

 Menzies Aviation - One of the worlds’ largest aviation services companies with operations on six continents, providing ground services, fuel services and air cargo services.
 Agility Logistics Parks - Class A warehousing and logistics complexes in the Middle East, Africa and South Asia. Agility is the largest private owner of industrial real estate in the Middle East and Africa.
 Tristar - a liquid logistics and transport  provider catering to the needs of the petroleum and chemical industries.
 United Projects for Aviation Services Company (UPAC) – commercial real estate development and facilities management company
 Shipa - digital logistics companies that provide self-service freight and logistics management (Shipa Freight); e-commerce fulfillment, IT integration and related services (Shipa Ecommerce); and last-mile and local delivery for businesses and consumers (Shipa Delivery).
 Global Clearinghouse Systems (GCS) - joint venture with Kuwait General Administration for Customs to support customs operations
 GCC Services – construction management and supply of remote living facilities for the mining, energy and engineering industries, and for international institutions.
 Inspection & Control Services (ICS) – technology and services used in customs clearance and processing.
 Agility Defense & Government Services (DGS) – public sector logistics and contracting.
 Metal and Recycling Company (MRC) – waste management.

Leadership

Tarek Sultan is the Vice Chairman of Agility. Sultan is a member of the Board of Directors of DSV A/S, a global top-three freight forwarding company, following DSV’s acquisition of Agility’s global logistics business in 2021. Sultan has also previously served as advisor to the Singapore Economic Development Board, sat on Wharton’s International Advisory Council, and served as a member of the Board of Directors of Gulf Bank and Burgan Bank. Sultan is an active supporter of the World Economic Forum (WEF). He holds an MBA from the Wharton School of the University of Pennsylvania.

History
Agility was established in 1979 as a state-owned company in Kuwait. Its original name was Public Warehousing Co. (PWC).  Tarek Sultan was named chairman and managing director when the company was privatized in 1997.
After privatization, Agility pursued a strategy of investment and expansion. Through acquisitions and establishment of new offices, it built a global presence in the Middle East, Asia, Africa and Latin America, where many of its more established competitors had yet to set up, and in the developed markets of Europe and North America. The company grew rapidly by acquiring other logistics companies and assets such as warehouses and trucks. Among its most significant acquisitions were the USA-based companies Geologistics Corp., Transoceanic Shipping Co. Inc., WTS of Houston and Global Express Line. Also purchased were Singaporean company Trans-Link Group; Swiss company Cronat Transport Holding AG; Globe Marine Services of Saudi Arabia; Cosa Freight in China; Kenya-based Starfreight; and Tristar Transport of UAE. The company also expanded Latin American operations with the acquisition of Trafinsa SA de CV in Mexico and Itatrans in Brazil.

By 2004, Agility, then still PWC, was the largest logistics provider in the Middle East. In 2006, the company unified its services under the new name of Agility with the brand slogan “A New Logistics Leader.”
Agility sold its commercial freight forwarding and logistics business in 2021 to DSV A/S for shares in the combined company, becoming the second-largest shareholder in the world’s #3 freight forwarder.

In 2022, Agility acquired Menzies Aviation, merging it with its aviation services company, National Aviation Services. The combined company will operate as Menzies Aviation and will be the world’s largest aviation services company by number of countries and second largest by number of airports served. The new Menzies Aviation will provide air cargo services, fuel services and ground services at airports on six continents.

The company continues to focus on its high-performing supply chain businesses in high-growth markets, developing and operating logistics parks across the Middle East, Africa and South Asia. Agility’s other subsidiaries offer ecommerce enablement and digital logistics, fuel logistics, commercial real estate, customs digitization and other supply chain services.. Through its venture capital arm, Agility Ventures , Agility invests in technologies and ventures that enhance supply chain efficiency and sustainability, and expand access to global trade.

Investor information

Agility shares have traded on the Kuwait Stock Exchange (KSE: AGLTY) since 1984 and the Dubai Financial Market (DFM: AGLTY) since 2006. Its estimated 14,000 shareholders include private and public institutions, along with individual investors. National Real Estate Co. (KSE: NRE) and Kuwait’s Public Institution for Social Security are two of Agility’s largest institutional investors. The company operates on a Jan. 1 – Dec. 31 fiscal year.

Emerging Markets

Agility annually publishes the Agility Emerging Markets Logistics Index. The Index offers a snapshot of logistics industry sentiment in a survey of supply chain executives and ranks the world’s 50 leading emerging markets based on their size, business conditions, infrastructure and other factors that make them attractive to logistics providers, freight forwarders, shipping lines, air cargo carriers and distributors.

In 2021, the company developed and conducted its 12th annual survey. Over 1,200 supply chain and logistics executives worldwide were asked about the impact of the COVID-19 pandemic on the world’s emerging markets, particularly on the logistics industry and how businesses will operate after the pandemic.

Sustainability
Agility’s sustainability efforts focus on environment, community investments, humanitarian logistics, and fair labor.

Agility has been a member of  Business for Social Responsibility’s  Clean Cargo Working Group, and the Sustainable Air Freight Alliance (SAFA). In both groups, Agility has worked with shippers, carriers and freight forwarders to improve  environmental and sustainability standards, practices and tools used to measure and manage  emissions.
Agility has been a partner of the UN Global Logistic Cluster’s Logistics Emergency Team  (LET). The LET draws on the capacity, expertise and resources of the logistics industry to respond to humanitarian emergencies and provide effective and efficient disaster relief” 

As a global business, Agility invests in education, community health and environment projects around the world in an effort to have a positive social impact in  communities where it operates. Many of its projects focus on creating local education and employment opportunities. Agility’s partnerships focus on youth and education that include long-term relationships with schools and local charities to provide digital literacy programs and secondary education or vocational training. In its partnership programs, its goal is for 50% or more of participants to be women and girls.

Agility has been ranked in the top 4% of the logistics industry by Ecovadis, and in the 10% of all companies overall for environmental performance. Agility is also a member of the FTSE4Good Index, recognizing the company’s strong ESG performance.

Controversy
From 2003 to 2010, Agility supplied food and related products to U.S. troops and contractors in Kuwait and Iraq under a series of Prime Vendor contracts awarded by the U.S. Defense Logistics Agency (DLA).
In May 2017, Agility and the U.S. Justice Department reached a legal settlement to resolve legal issues involving allegations that the company overcharged DLA on the food contracts. The company pleaded to a  misdemeanor involving a single invoice for $551. The misdemeanor was unrelated to the Justice Department’s original felony allegations, which were dropped. The company also agreed to a payment of $95 million to resolve parallel civil proceedings.

References

External links
The 2009 BCG 100 New Global Challengers: How Companies from Rapidly Developing Economies Are Contending for Global Leadership
The Top 50 3PLs, Logistics Management, June 1, 2009
The World’s Top 3PLs, Arabian Supply Chain, August 17 

Business services companies established in 1979
Companies listed on the Dubai Financial Market
Logistics companies
Companies of Kuwait
Kuwaiti brands
Kuwaiti companies established in 1979
Companies listed on the Boursa Kuwait